Marilyn Stasio  is a New York City author, writer and literary critic. She has been the "Crime Columnist" for The New York Times Book Review since about 1988, having written over 650 reviews as of January 2009. She says she reads "a few" crime books a year professionally (about 150) and many more for pleasure. She also writes for Variety, The New York Post, New York magazine and others. She has served as a dramaturg at the Eugene O'Neill Theater Center.

In 1990 she interviewed British writer Ruth Rendell.

Bibliography
Showtune: A Memoir (1996; with Jerry Herman)
Sweet Revenge: 10 Plays of Bloody Murder (1992; with Marvin Kaye)
Broadway's Beautiful Losers: The Strange History of Five Neglected Plays (1972)

References

External links
An archive of crime and mystery fiction reviewed by Marilyn Stasio since January 1997, sorted by author, not a complete list.
Book Reviews, by Marilyn Stasio at the New York Times.
Article by Marilyn Stasio at Variety
 

Living people
Year of birth missing (living people)
American literary critics
Women literary critics
Critics employed by The New York Times
American women journalists
Dramaturges
Variety (magazine) people
21st-century American women
American women critics